This article provides details of international football games played by the Hungary national football team from 1970 to 1989.

Results

1970

1971

1972

1973

1974

1975

1976

1977

1978

1979

1980

1981

1982

1983

1984

1985

1986

1987

1988

1989

References 

Football in Hungary
Hungary national football team results
1970s in Hungarian sport
1980s in Hungarian sport